Déli pályaudvar (Southern railway station) is the western terminus of the M2 (East-West) line of the Budapest Metro. It serves the Déli railway station and its vicinity. The station was open on 22 December 1972 as the terminus of the extension of the line from Deák Ferenc tér.

Connections
 Déli pályaudvar Hungarian State Railways (MÁV)
 Tram
17 Bécsi út / Vörösvári út – Savoya Park
56 Hűvösvölgy – Városház tér
56A Hűvösvölgy – Móricz Zsigmond körtér
59 Szent János Kórház – Márton Áron tér
59A Széll Kálmán tér – Márton Áron tér
59B Hűvösvölgy – Márton Áron tér
61 Hűvösvölgy – Móricz Zsigmond körtér
 Bus: 21, 21A, 39, 102, 139, 140, 140A
 Regional bus: 770

Gallery

References

External links

M2 (Budapest Metro) stations
Railway stations opened in 1973